The L&YR Class 21 is a class of small 0-4-0ST steam locomotive built by the Lancashire and Yorkshire Railway for shunting duties. They were nicknamed Pugs.

Construction history 
The class originates in the purchase of three saddle tank locomotives ordered from Vulcan Foundry in 1886.

Seventeen of this modified design were ordered from Horwich Works in three batches; Aspinall's successor Henry Hoy order another batch of 10; and Hoy's successor George Hughes ordered 30 more in two batches.

The last locomotive was delivered in July 1910, four months before the first retirement; 917 and 918 were withdrawn in November that year, but were not scrapped until November 1912.

Operational history 

The London, Midland and Scottish Railway (LMS) gave the locomotives the power classification 0F. In total sixty were made between 1886 and 1910. They were built for use in sharply curved sidings for shunting duties. The Pugs were allocated by the L&YR for operation in the industrial areas and docks of Fleetwood, Goole, Liverpool and Salford. In later times they became more widely dispersed, reaching places such as Bristol, Bangor, Crewe, Derby, Widnes, York and Swansea. When the LMS was merged into British Railways on 1 January 1948, 23 'Pugs' remained in service; BR added 40,000 to their fleet numbers.

Withdrawal 
Withdrawals started in 1910 with two going in that year. Four went in the 1920s, 31 in the 1930s; leaving 23 to be withdrawn between 1957 and 1964.

Accidents and incidents

Preservation 

Two "Pugs" have survived into preservation, both through the Lancashire and Yorkshire Railway Trust.
L&YR No. 19 (LMS No. 11243), built in 1910, was sold by the LMS into industry in 1931 and was acquired by the Trust from the United Glass Bottle Manufacturers Ltd. at Charlton in 1967. It was found to be in poor mechanical condition and was later placed on static display pending overhaul, most recently at the Ribble Steam Railway. In early 2020 the locomotive moved to the East Lancashire Railway in Bury. Following an inspection of its condition, it was decided to proceed with restoring it to working order. This restoration is now in progress.

L&YR No. 68 (LMS No. 11218, BR No. 51218), built in 1901, was purchased directly from British Rail in 1964 and moved to the Keighley and Worth Valley Railway in January 1965. The locomotive was re-tubed in 1974 and took part in the Stockton & Darlington Railway cavalcade that year. The locomotive was overhauled again in 1997 and continued in service, albeit mostly as a shunting locomotive due to its low power, until its boiler tubes required replacement in 2006. The locomotive carried its original identity of L&YR 68 from 2004 onwards, but has been cosmetically restored in 2018 to 51218 for the K&WVR's 50th Anniversary Gala, reflecting that 51218 was the first loco to arrive in 1965. Overhaul is now under consideration at Haworth on the K&WVR as the restoration of 0-6-0ST No. 752 has now been completed at the East Lancashire Railway.

Models 

Several models of the 'Pug' have been produced commercially.

The first was a 'OO'-scale polystyrene kit made in the 1960s by Kitmaster, the moulds for which were subsequently sold to Airfix then passed on to Dapol, which still manufactures the former Airfix plastic kit range. This kit has often been used as the basis for a narrow-gauge 'pug bash' locomotive running on 00-9 tracks.

A ready-to-run OO model was produced initially by Dapol and then Hornby where the Pug was produced until 2000. The Pug was reintroduced to Hornby's range in 2010 (R2927) in early British Railways Livery. It was also made in 2019 in the LMS livery.

Larger scale models are available from a number of suppliers including Tower Models of Blackpool.

See also
 Pug (steam locomotive)

References

External links

 Lancashire and Yorkshire Railway Trust, owners of 19 and 68
 Class LYR21 Details at Rail UK
 Details of no. 19

21
0-4-0ST locomotives
Railway locomotives introduced in 1886